Bancroft may refer to:

People
Bancroft (surname)

Places

Australia
 Bancroft, Queensland, a locality in the North Burnett Region, Queensland, Australia

Canada
Bancroft, Ontario

United Kingdom
Bancroft, Milton Keynes

United States
Bancroft, California
Bancroft, Idaho
Bancroft, Iowa
Bancroft, Kentucky
Bancroft, Louisiana
Bancroft, Maine
Bancroft, Michigan
Bancroft, Minneapolis, Minnesota
Bancroft, Missouri
Bancroft, Nebraska
Bancroft, South Dakota
Bancroft, West Virginia
Bancroft, Wisconsin
Bancroft Creek, a stream in Minnesota
Bancroft Township (disambiguation) (multiple places)

Zambia
The former name of Chililabombwe

Literature
Bancroft Pons, a fictional character in the Solar Pons stories by August Derleth
Bancroft Prize, an American literary award from Columbia University

Schools
Bancroft Middle School (Los Angeles, California), an American public middle school located in Los Angeles, California
Bancroft Middle School (San Leandro, California), an American public middle school located in San Leandro, California
Bancroft School, an American private K-12 school in Worcester, Massachusetts
Bancroft School of Massage Therapy, an American trade school in Worcester, Massachusetts
Bancroft's School, a British independent school in Woodford Green, London

Ships
Bancroft (motor vessel), a 1925 ship preserved in Baltimore, Maryland, in the United States
USCS Bancroft, a schooner in commission as a survey ship in the United States Coast Survey from 1846 to 1862
USS Bancroft, the name of more than one United States Navy ship
USS George Bancroft (SSBN-643), a United States Navy fleet ballistic missile submarine in commission from 1966 to 1993

Other
 Bancroft (crater), a crater on the Moon
 Bancroft (TV series), a 2017 British TV series
 Bancroft Hall, a dormitory at the United States Naval Academy
 Bancroft Hall,a  dormitory at Phillips Exeter Academy
 Bancroft Library, University of California at Berkeley, United States
 Bancroft Mills, a factory in Wilmington, Delaware, United States
 Bancroft Point, a real binary system where the components have equal saturation pressure and exhibit azeotropy
 Bancroft PLLC, a U.S. law firm
 Bancroft, a character in the 1980 film Hangar 18